A microcrystalline material is a crystallized substance or rock that contains small crystals visible only through microscopic examination. There is little agreement on the range of crystal sizes that should be regarded as microcrystalline, but the extreme range of values suggested is 1 to 200 microns.

See also
 Macrocrystalline
 Nanocrystalline silicon
 Microcrystalline cellulose
 Microcrystalline wax
 Protocrystalline
 Rock microstructure

References

Mineralogy concepts
Petrology